In the run up to the 2016 Spanish general election, various organisations carried out opinion polling to gauge the opinions that voters hold towards political leaders. Results of such polls are displayed in this article. The date range for these opinion polls is from the previous general election, held on 20 December 2015, to the day the next election was held, on 26 June 2016.

Preferred Prime Minister
The table below lists opinion polling on leader preferences to become Prime Minister.

Predicted Prime Minister
The table below lists opinion polling on the perceived likelihood for each leader to become Prime Minister.

Approval ratings
The tables below list the public approval ratings of the leaders and leading candidates of the main political parties in Spain.

Mariano Rajoy

Pedro Sánchez

Pablo Iglesias

Albert Rivera

Alberto Garzón

References